DUK may refer to:

 Diabetes UK
 Digital University Kerala, in Kerala, India, see Kerala University of Digital Sciences, Innovation and Technology
 DUK, film distributor, see Edwin J. Fancey
 Duke Energy (NYSE:DUK)

See also
Duk (disambiguation)